Lord Oblitey Commey is a Ghanaian administrator, entrepreneur and politician. He is a member of the New Patriotic Party and the current Director of Operations at the Jubilee House, the official residence and office of the President of Ghana. He has served as an executive member of Accra Hearts of Oak Sporting Club and is a former youth organizer for the New Patriotic Party.

Early life and education
Lord Commey was born in 1969 in Accra. He attended St. Thomas Aquinas Senior High School.He was awarded honorary Master's degree by the New London Graduate School and an Honorary Doctorate Degree in Public administration, Honoris causa by the Commonwealth University in 2017.

Working life
For several years in the early 2000s, Lord Commey served as an executive member of the Board of Accra Hearts of Oak Sporting Club. He continues to take interest in football development in the country. He helped organize Rumbe@60 - the 60th Independence Football match between Accra Hearts of Oak and Kumasi Asante Kotoko football club. He was a member of the Ghana@60 planning committee which was tasked with planning and holding celebratory events to mark 60 years if Ghana's independence.

Political life
Lord Commey was the National Youth Organizer of the New Patriotic Party from 1999 to 2003. Lord Commey was appointed the Operations Director for the Nana Akufo-Addo campaign prior to the 2012 Ghanaian general election. It was after his appointment that members of the opposition National Democratic Congress accused him of engaging in acts that cause confusion at political rallies through the use of thugs. He has spoken on several national issues including distancing the NPP from comments made by Haruna Esseku, a former party chairman. Esseku had claimed that the 1966 Coup d'état that ousted the Kwame Nkrumah administration had restored multiparty democracy to Ghana. Lord Commey refuted the claim and stated that the New Patriotic Party had never and will never support the idea of coup d'état whether in Ghana or elsewhere.

In January 2017 he was appointed by President Nana Akuffo-Addo as Director of Operations at the presidential palace, The Flagstaff House. His appointment was hailed by many New Patriotic Party members who believed that due to his constant engagement with the grassroots supporters, he would be a conduit between them and the president. Some also believed that he was being rewarded for all the work he did to ensure that the party won the 2016 Ghanaian general election. He has been forced to dunk several rumours that he had been sacked in June 2017 for being strong willed and unwilling to accept opposing views to his. He ascertained that having been in Ghanaian politics for over 25 years, he had learnt how to deal with such rumours, which in his view were meant to distract him from the working he had been appointed to do.

Personal life
Oblitey Commey is married with three daughters.

References

Living people
New Patriotic Party politicians
People from Greater Accra Region
Year of birth missing (living people)